
Bukowice  is a village in the administrative district of Gmina Krośnice, within Milicz County, Lower Silesian Voivodeship, in south-western Poland.

The village has a population of 1,850.

References

Bukowice